Saint-Sornin is a commune in the Charente-Maritime department in southwestern France.

Saint Sornin is just off the main road between Saintes and Marennes. There is only a bar/cafe and a bakery in the village, with the closest shops in Marennes. There is a small campsite just outside the village on the road to Brue. The road to Brue is a dead end, but there are some old ruins and a small bird life museum at the end of the road.

Population

See also
Communes of the Charente-Maritime department

References

Communes of Charente-Maritime